Akademia Piłkarska Orlen Gdańsk is a footballing academy based in Gdańsk, Poland. It focuses on training and developing players in the Pomeranian region and is well known for its development of female players with the women's football team being the academies most successful section, with AP Orlen playing in the Ekstraliga, the highest division of women's football in Poland. The team name includes the name of their title sponsor and main funder of the academy, PKN Orlen, a Polish oil company.

AP Orlen has often been known as APLG during its early years due to these being the initials of the club's first two names, being formerly known as Akademia Piłkarska Lechia Gdańsk from 2010 to 2020 and then Akademia Piłkarska Lotos Gdańsk from 2020 to 2022.

History

APLG were founded in 2010 with close cooperation with Lechia Gdańsk and funded by the Lotos group. APLG became part of the "Football Future" program which is operated by Lotos, and has the goal of introducing football and promoting physical activities to children. APLG and Lechia Gdańsk had a cooperation agreement in place in which APLG would train players up to the age of 15 with those being good enough transferring into the Lechia Academy. After Lechia extended their own academy to include younger players the strong cooperation between Lechia and APLG started to break down. While the academy and Lechia still cooperate with each other the benefits shared are not as strong as they once were. Since 2015 APLG and the Lotos group have run the footballing academy as an independent entity.

In September 2020 the team removed all association with Lechia Gdańsk removing Lechia from its name and replacing it with Lotos, the Gdańsk based oil refinery which funded the club, becoming "Akademia Piłkarska Lotos Gdańsk" to be shortened as "AP Lotos Gdańsk". This name change was also due to the confusion with Lechia Gdańsk and some fans and those associated with ALPG feeling as though the team had no identity of their own. The name change to AP Lotos coincided with the women's team's promotion to the Ekstraliga.

In August 2022, Grupa Lotos were taken over by the Polish oil refining company, PKN Orlen. This take over saw AP Lotos changing their name to AP Orlen.

Club names

Akademia Piłkarska Lechia Gdańsk (2010–2020)
Akademia Piłkarska Lotos Gdańsk (2020–2022)
Akademia Piłkarska Orlen Gdańsk (2022–)

Women's football
AP Orlens Women's football section was formed in 2014 and has enjoyed early success rising up the leagues, finishing runners-up and third in the III liga, and winners of both the II liga and I liga along their way to promotion to the Ekstraliga. 2020–21 was the club's first season in Poland's top league where the team finished in a respectable ninth place. They went one better in their second top flight season, finishing eighth.

Seasons

Notes

Colours
To start with while the AP Orlen team was very closely linked with Lechia Gdańsk, they wore the Lechia kits and using the team's colours. While the team still used green as a predominant colour after the gradual distancing of the two clubs, it had changed to dark grey, black, and white as of their first season in the Ekstraliga and when the team were known as AP Lotos. After becoming AP Orlen, Black and pink were the predominant colours on the women's home kits.

Former academy players
The following notable players have spent time developing in the APLG academy system.

(Correct as of 30 January 2023)

Honours

Women's team
I liga (Northern group) (second tier)
Winners (1): 2019-20 

II liga (Wielkopolska group) (third tier)
Winners (1): 2016-17

III liga (Pomeranian group) (fourth tier)
Runners up (1): 2014-15
Third place (1): 2015-16

Notes

References

2010 establishments in Poland
Association football clubs established in 2010
Women's football clubs in Poland
Sport in Gdańsk
Football clubs in Pomeranian Voivodeship